The 2016–17 Princeton Tigers men's basketball team represented Princeton University during the 2016–17 NCAA Division I men's basketball season. The Tigers, led by sixth-year head coach Mitch Henderson, played their home games at Jadwin Gymnasium as members of the Ivy League. They finished the season 23–7, 14–0 in Ivy League play to win the Ivy League regular season championship. They defeated Penn and Yale to win the inaugural Ivy League tournament championship. As a result, they earned the conference's automatic bid to the NCAA tournament as the No. 12 seed in the West Region. There they lost in the First Round to Notre Dame.

Previous season
The Tigers finished the 2015–16 season 22–7, 12–2 in Ivy League play to finish in second place. They were invited to the National Invitation Tournament where they lost in the first round to Virginia Tech.

Offseason

Departures

2016 recruiting class

2017 recruiting class

Roster

Schedule and results

|-
!colspan=8 style=| Non-conference regular season

|-
!colspan=8 style=| Ivy League regular Season

|-
!colspan=9 style=| Ivy League Tournament

|-
!colspan=9 style=| NCAA tournament

Honors and accomplishments
Mitch Henderson was a unanimous Ivy League Coach of the Year selection.

Senior forward Spencer Weisz was selected as Ivy League Men's Basketball Player of the Year and a unanimous All-Ivy League first team honoree, despite only ranking fourth on Princeton in scoring average. He became the 8th player in Ivy League history to win both the league's Rookie of the Year Award and Player of the Year Award.  Weisz also earned honorable mention on the Associated Press All-America team, and was named to the Jewish Sports Review 2016-17 Men's College Basketball All-American First Team.  Weisz led Princeton in rebounds, assists (4.2 per game; 125; 2nd in the league), and steals (1.5 per game; 46; 2nd in the Ivy League), while coming in 2nd in the league in assist-to-turnover ratio (2.6), 5th in 3-point field goals (61) and defensive rebounds (137), and 10th in total rebounds (161). In December 2016, he tied the Princeton single-game record for assists in a game, with 13 against Liberty.  He posted his career high of 26 points in a February 3, 2017, 69–64 victory over Dartmouth.  He served again as a co-captain.

Senior Steven Cook  was also a unanimous All-Ivy League first team honoree, and was named a third team Academic All-America selection. Cook was included on the National Association of Basketball Coaches Division I All‐District 13 first-team.  Weisz and Devin Cannady were second team selections.

Myles Stephens was named Ivy League Defensive Player of the Year and an All-Ivy League first team honoree.  Stephens was the most outstanding player of the 2017 Ivy League men's basketball tournament, and Cook was also on the All-Tournament team. The tournament was the inaugural Ivy League men's basketball tournament. By virtue of winning the tournament, the team earned Princeton its first NCAA Division I men's basketball tournament invitation since the 2010–11 team did so.

See also
 2016–17 Princeton Tigers women's basketball team

References

Princeton Tigers men's basketball seasons
Princeton
Princeton Tigers men's basketball
Princeton Tigers men's basketball
Princeton